West Derbyshire was a county constituency represented in the House of Commons of the Parliament of the United Kingdom. From 1885, until it was replaced by the Derbyshire Dales constituency in the 2010 general election, it elected one Member of Parliament (MP) by the first past the post voting system. It was a safe Conservative seat for most of its existence.

Boundaries
This was the only really safe Conservative seat in Derbyshire, consisting mostly of rural villages and tourist towns like Bakewell and Matlock; Labour's only strengths were in Wirksworth and Masson, not enough to end the long-standing Conservative representation of this seat.

Boundary review
Following their review of parliamentary representation in Derbyshire, the Boundary Commission for England created a new constituency of Derbyshire Dales based on the existing West Derbyshire constituency.

History

Historically associated with the Cavendish family, the seat and its predecessors were usually represented by one of the future Dukes of Devonshire or their relatives from 1580 until the Second World War. When the Cavendish family left the Liberals over Irish Home Rule the seat stayed loyal to them as they sat first as Liberal Unionists then as Conservatives. In 1918 the hold on the constituency was briefly broken by Charles Frederick White standing for the Liberals, but the seat was regained in 1923. In a by-election in 1944, White's son, also called Charles Frederick White resigned as the official Labour nominee in order to stand against the wartime party truce. He defeated the Conservative candidate, William Cavendish, Marquess of Hartington, and subsequently took the Labour whip in the Commons, holding the seat in the 1945 general election for Labour. The Conservatives regained the seat in the 1950 general election and have held it ever since. The closest they have come to losing was in the 1986 by-election when they held it by only 100 votes in a period of heavy unpopularity for the government of Margaret Thatcher.

Members of Parliament

Elections

Elections in the 1880s

Elections in the 1890s

Elections in the 1900s

Elections in the 1910s 

General Election 1914–15:

Another General Election was required to take place before the end of 1915. The political parties had been making preparations for an election to take place and by the July 1914, the following candidates had been selected; 
Unionist:Henry Petty-Fitzmaurice
Liberal: Charles White

Elections in the 1920s

Elections in the 1930s

General Election 1939–40

Another General Election was required to take place before the end of 1940. The political parties had been making preparations for an election to take place from 1939 and by the end of this year, the following candidates had been selected; 
Conservative: Henry Hunloke 
Labour: Charles White
Liberal: James Ivor Waddington

Elections in the 1940s

Elections in the 1950s

Elections in the 1960s

Elections in the 1970s

Elections in the 1980s

Elections in the 1990s

Elections in the 2000s

See also
List of parliamentary constituencies in Derbyshire

Notes and references
Craig, F. W. S. (1983). British parliamentary election results 1918–1949 (3 ed.). Chichester: Parliamentary Research Services. .

Sources
Guardian Unlimited Politics (Election results from 1992 to the present)
http://www.psr.keele.ac.uk/ (Election results from 1951 to the present)

Constituencies of the Parliament of the United Kingdom established in 1885
Constituencies of the Parliament of the United Kingdom disestablished in 2010
Parliamentary constituencies in Derbyshire (historic)